Chakrapan Theinthong (born 9 April 1961) is a Thai sports shooter. He competed in the men's 50 metre rifle three positions event at the 1984 Summer Olympics.

References

1961 births
Living people
Chakrapan Theinthong
Chakrapan Theinthong
Shooters at the 1984 Summer Olympics
Place of birth missing (living people)
Chakrapan Theinthong